Be'er Ora is a community settlement 19 kilometers north of Eilat in  the far south of Israel. Located in the Arava region, just west of Highway 90, north of kibbutz Eilot, and south of Elifaz and Timna Park, it falls under the jurisdiction of Hevel Eilot Regional Council.

History

Before the settlement was founded, Be'er Ora was previously the site of an Israeli army base.  In 1968, Be'er Ora was the site of the bombing of a school bus carrying Israeli high school students, an incident that led to Israeli Defense Forces retaliating against a Palestine Liberation Organization base in neighboring Jordan in the Battle of Karameh.  

The current Be'er Ora settlement was founded in 2001 as part of a program to populate the Arava and to bring people from central Israel to the Negev, which was determined to be a preferred place for new settlement. Previously there was a Gadna army base, also called Be'er Ora, in that location. 

The word "Be'er" means "well of water". Before the community was established, there was a well within its area that served as the first source of freshwater for Eilat, before Eilat was connected to the national water network. The word "Ora" (light) is borrowed from the nearby Ora Mountain and Ora Creek.

Aviation 
In 2004, the government decided to move the activity of Eilat Airport to a then empty area near Be'er Ora. Ramon Airport opened in 2019.

References

Community settlements
Populated places in Southern District (Israel)
Populated places established in 2001
2001 establishments in Israel